Milagros Palma (born 19 May 1973) is a Cuban fencer. She competed in the women's individual and team épée events at the 1996 Summer Olympics.

References

1973 births
Living people
Cuban female épée fencers
Olympic fencers of Cuba
Fencers at the 1996 Summer Olympics
People from Cienfuegos
Pan American Games medalists in fencing
Pan American Games silver medalists for Cuba
Fencers at the 1995 Pan American Games
20th-century Cuban women
21st-century Cuban women